Arqakaghni monastery, was an Armenian monastery in the western part of Adana province of modern Turkey, which lies 9 km southeast of Mamestia, a city in the east of Cilician plain.

Etymology
The monastery has two different names:
 Arqakaghni (or Arqakaghin), which in Armenian language means King oak, because the monastery was surrounded by oak trees.
 Hachoyakatar, which in Armenian language literally means darling ridge, but is identified with Mother of God.

The Exterior
The monastery consisted of several churches, and lay in a forest of oaks, plane and olive trees.

History
Arqakaghni monastery was founded in 1122 near Mopsuestia, an ancient city in Cilician Armenia, as the seat of Mopsuestia's bishop. It also served as:
 A rich storage of rare medieval Armenian books and manuscripts
 A medieval school and university
 The creating house of manuscripts and hand-written books
 A notable center of Armenian folk and church music.
Some medieval Armenian historians (listed below) eulogized Arqakaghni monastery:
 Vardan Areveltsi  (13th century)
 Kirakos Gandzaketsi  (13th century)
 Smbat Gundstabl  (13th century)
 Hovhannes Yerznkatsi  (13th century)

Medieval Armenian author and priest Vardan Aygektsi also studied there.

In 1206–08 Arqakaghni monastery became archbishop David Arqakaghneci's residence. Buried at the monastery were Levon II, his father Stephane, Grigor Apirat., and the Catholicos of the Armenian Church. 

A devastating earthquake in 1269 damaged the monastery, but in 1284 the monastery was reconstructed and continued functioning until the Armenian massacres in Adana province when it was damaged again. During the Armenian genocide of 1915, it was destroyed completely by the Turks.

References

See also
Monastery of the Miracles
Yeghrdut monastery

Armenian churches in Turkey
Christian monasteries established in the 12th century
Armenian Kingdom of Cilicia
Destroyed churches in Turkey
Demolished buildings and structures in Turkey
1915 disestablishments in the Ottoman Empire
Buildings and structures demolished in 1915
12th century in Asia
1122 establishments in Asia
Churches destroyed by Muslims